The 2019 Money in the Bank was the 10th annual Money in the Bank professional wrestling pay-per-view and livestreaming event produced by WWE. It was held for wrestlers from the promotion's Raw, SmackDown, and 205 Live brand divisions. The event took place on May 19, 2019, at the XL Center in Hartford, Connecticut.

Twelve matches were contested at the event including one on the Kickoff pre-show. In the main event, unannounced entrant Brock Lesnar won the men's Money in the Bank ladder match. Bayley won the women's ladder match in the opening match, and later cashed in the contract to win the SmackDown Women's Championship from Charlotte Flair, who herself had just won the title from Becky Lynch. In her other title defense, Lynch retained the Raw Women's Championship against Lacey Evans. In other prominent matches, Kofi Kingston defeated Kevin Owens to retain SmackDown's WWE Championship, while Seth Rollins defeated AJ Styles to retain Raw's Universal Championship.

Production

Background 
Money in the Bank is an annual gimmick pay-per-view (PPV) and WWE Network event produced by WWE since 2010, generally held between June and July. The concept of the show comes from WWE's established Money in the Bank ladder match, in which multiple wrestlers use ladders to retrieve a briefcase hanging above the ring. While the briefcases at the 2018 event contained contracts that guaranteed the winners a match for a world championship of their respective brand at any time within the next year, the 2019 contracts allowed the winners the choice of either brands' world championships. Since the 2017 event, each year's show has featured a men's and a women's ladder match, and beginning with 2018, each features eight wrestlers, evenly divided between the Raw and SmackDown brands. Male wrestlers competed for a contract to grant them a match for either Raw's Universal Championship or SmackDown's WWE Championship, while female wrestlers competed for a Raw Women's Championship or SmackDown Women's Championship match contract. The 2019 event was the 10th event in the Money in the Bank chronology and featured wrestlers from the Raw, SmackDown, and 205 Live brands—the only to feature the 205 Live brand. The 2019 event also moved Money in the Bank to the May slot of WWE's pay-per-view calendar, taking place on May 19, 2019, at the XL Center in Hartford, Connecticut.

Storylines 
The card composed twelve matches, including one on the Kickoff pre-show, that resulted from scripted storylines, where wrestlers portrayed villains, heroes, or less distinguishable characters in scripted events that built tension and culminated in a wrestling match or series of matches. Results were predetermined by WWE's writers on the Raw, SmackDown, and 205 Live brands, while storylines were produced on WWE's weekly television shows, Monday Night Raw, SmackDown Live, and the cruiserweight-exclusive 205 Live.

At WrestleMania 35, Becky Lynch defeated Ronda Rousey and Charlotte Flair in a winner takes all triple threat match to win both the Raw and SmackDown Women's Championships. She was then double-booked to defend both championships at Money in the Bank. For the Raw Women's Championship, NXT call-up Lacey Evans attacked the double champion on both Raw and SmackDown following WrestleMania. Evans was subsequently drafted to Raw during the Superstar Shake-up and defeated Natalya to earn a Raw Women's Championship match. For the SmackDown Women's Championship, former champion Charlotte Flair took offense that she lost her title despite not being the one who was pinned at WrestleMania. Lynch exclaimed that she would not freely give Flair a rematch and demanded new challengers. Among the named challengers was new SmackDown draftee Bayley. Flair then defeated Bayley to earn a SmackDown Women's Championship match.

On the April 22 episode of Raw, Chief Operating Officer Triple H scheduled two triple threat matches with the winners facing each other to determine Seth Rollins' next challenger for the Universal Championship. New Raw draftee AJ Styles defeated fellow draftees Rey Mysterio and Samoa Joe in the first triple threat match, while Baron Corbin defeated Drew McIntyre and new draftee The Miz in the second. Styles then defeated Corbin to earn a Universal Championship match against Rollins at Money in the Bank.

On the April 16 episode of SmackDown, WWE Chairman/CEO Vince McMahon introduced Elias as "the biggest acquisition in SmackDown history". Both were then interrupted by fellow new draftee Roman Reigns, who attacked Elias and performed a superman punch on Mr. McMahon. The following week, Shane McMahon challenged Reigns to a fight for attacking his father. Reigns came out and was attacked from behind by Elias, who assisted Shane in beating up Reigns. Elias then challenged Reigns to a match at Money in the Bank and Reigns accepted.

During "A Moment of Bliss" on the April 29 episode of Raw, Alexa Bliss revealed Raw's four participants for the men's Money in the Bank ladder match: Braun Strowman, new draftee Ricochet, Drew McIntyre, and Baron Corbin. On SmackDown the next night, SmackDown's four participants were revealed: Ali, new draftee Finn Bálor, Andrade, and Randy Orton. On Raw the following week, Robert Roode (formerly Bobby Roode) had the chance to replace Ricochet in the ladder match if he could defeat Ricochet, but was unsuccessful. Sami Zayn then defeated Strowman in a falls count anywhere match on the May 13 episode of Raw after interference from Corbin and McIntyre, taking Strowman's spot.

The four participants from Raw in the women's Money in the Bank ladder match were also revealed by Alexa Bliss during a separate "A Moment of Bliss" segment on the April 29 episode of Raw: Natalya, Dana Brooke, new draftee Naomi, and Bliss herself. SmackDown's four participants were revealed on the following night's episode of SmackDown: Bayley, Mandy Rose, new draftee Ember Moon, and Carmella. On the May 13 episode of Raw, Bliss, who had lost her luggage, was replaced by new draftee Nikki Cross in a fatal four-way match between Raw's four participants. Cross won the match and later replaced Bliss in the ladder match as Bliss was not medically cleared to compete.

At WrestleMania 35, Shane McMahon defeated The Miz in a falls count anywhere match; during the match, Shane attacked Miz's father. Miz was then drafted to Raw during the Superstar Shake-up and attacked Shane as retribution. On the April 29 episode of Raw, during Miz's match against Bobby Lashley, Shane distracted Miz, causing him to lose, leading to a brawl. Later, Miz challenged Shane to a steel cage match at Money in the Bank and Shane accepted.

On the April 16 episode of SmackDown, New Day members Kofi Kingston and Xavier Woods were guests on "The KO Show" where host Kevin Owens congratulated Kingston for winning the WWE Championship by defeating Daniel Bryan at WrestleMania 35. With fellow New Day member Big E out with injury, Owens wanted to join New Day as their third member. Kingston and Woods accepted "Big O" as an honorary member and the three won a six-man tag team match later that night. The following week, after Rusev attacked Kingston during his match with Shinsuke Nakamura, a brawl broke out also involving Woods and Owens. Owens then turned on Kingston and attacked him and Woods, proclaiming that he wanted the WWE Championship. Kingston then challenged Owens to a match at Money in the Bank with his title on the line and Owens accepted.

At WrestleMania 35, Samoa Joe defeated Rey Mysterio in one minute to retain the United States Championship. Both were then drafted to Raw in the Superstar Shake-up, and Mysterio defeated Joe in a non-title rematch on the April 29 episode of Raw. The following week, another title match between the two was scheduled for Money in the Bank.

On the April 23 episode of 205 Live, Ariya Daivari defeated Oney Lorcan. General Manager Drake Maverick then scheduled Tony Nese to defend the WWE Cruiserweight Championship against Daivari at Money in the Bank.

After losing the SmackDown Tag Team Championship to The Hardy Boyz (Jeff Hardy and Matt Hardy), The Usos (Jey Uso and Jimmy Uso) were drafted to Raw in the Superstar Shake-up. Two weeks later, The Hardys relinquished the title after Jeff suffered a knee injury. On the May 7 episode of SmackDown, The Usos appeared via the Wild Card Rule to challenge Daniel Bryan and Rowan for the vacant title in a losing effort. The following week, a non-title match between the two teams was scheduled for the Money in the Bank Kickoff pre-show.

Event

Pre-show 
During the Money in the Bank Kickoff pre-show, The Usos (Jey Uso and Jimmy Uso) faced SmackDown Tag Team Champions Daniel Bryan and Rowan in a non-title match. In the end, The Usos performed a double "Uso Splash" on Bryan to win the match.

Preliminary matches 
The actual pay-per-view opened with the women's Money in the Bank ladder match, featuring Dana Brooke, Naomi, Natalya, and Nikki Cross from Raw, and Bayley, Carmella, Ember Moon, and Mandy Rose from SmackDown. The climax occurred when Carmella, whose knee had been inadvertently injured by Rose earlier, returned and climbed the ladder, but Rose's tag team partner Sonya Deville pulled Carmella off the ladder and performed a spear on her. Deville then lifted Rose up on her shoulders and ascended the ladder. As Rose was about to retrieve the briefcase, however, Bayley ascended the ladder from the other side, pushed Rose and Deville off, and unhooked the briefcase to win the match.

Next, Samoa Joe defended the United States Championship against Rey Mysterio. In the end, Mysterio countered Joe's Powerbomb into a hurricanrana roll-up and got the pinfall victory to win the title despite Joe's right shoulder being up, which the referee did not see. With the win, Mysterio became WWE's twenty-first Grand Slam Champion. After the match, as Mysterio was celebrating with his son Dominik, Joe viciously attacked Mysterio with two "ura-nages". Dominik then helped his father backstage.

After that, The Miz fought Shane McMahon in a steel cage match. Throughout the match, Shane tried various ways to escape the cage. In the end, as Shane tried to escape the cage, Miz caught him. Miz attempted to pull Shane back in the cage by his shirt, however, Shane slipped out of it and fell to the outside floor to win the match by escaping the cage.

Next, Tony Nese defended the WWE Cruiserweight Championship against Ariya Daivari. In the end, Nese performed a Running Nese on Daivari to retain.

Earlier in the night, Sami Zayn had pleaded with Triple H regarding Braun Strowman. Triple H assured Zayn he had nothing to worry about as he supposedly banned Strowman from the building. Following the United States Championship Match, Strowman was shown backstage, angrily searching for Zayn. Following the steel cage match, Zayn had been brutally attacked, rendering him unable to compete in the men's Money in the Bank ladder match. Triple H then searched for Strowman, who denied that he had attacked Zayn. Triple H stated that Strowman would not be replacing Zayn in the ladder match and requested Strowman to leave the arena, who reluctantly agreed.

Next, Becky Lynch defended the Raw Women's Championship against Lacey Evans in her first of two title defenses. In the end, Evans went for a roll-up on Lynch, who countered into a Dis-Arm-Her, forcing Evans to submit to retain the title.

As Lynch was about to head backstage to recover for her SmackDown Women's Championship defense later, Charlotte Flair made her entrance, ready for the match. Instead of heading backstage, Lynch agreed to have the match immediately. In the end, as Flair attempted the Natural Selection on the apron, Lynch countered. Evans then returned and attacked Lynch with the "Women's Right" while the referee was distracted. Flair then performed a Big Boot on Lynch to win the title for a record fourth time. A furious Lynch then attacked Evans on the outside of the ring. Flair assisted Evans and attacked Lynch. After some double-teaming by Evans and Flair, Money in the Bank winner Bayley came out to make the save. Flair, however, attacked both Bayley and Lynch. As Flair attempted a spear on Bayley, Bayley avoided Flair who crashed into the ring post. Bayley then took advantage of the opportunity and cashed in her Money in the Bank contract on Flair. Bayley delivered a "Diving Elbow Drop" from the top rope on Flair to win the SmackDown Women's Championship for the first time, which was the 2nd fastest cash-in in 40 minutes after winning the contract. The win also made Bayley the first woman to win the Raw, SmackDown, NXT, and Women's Tag Team Championships, as well as WWE's first women's Grand Slam and Triple Crown winner.

After that, Roman Reigns was attacked backstage by Elias with a guitar. Elias then came out and sang a song insulting the fans in Hartford. As Elias was making his exit, Reigns appeared and attacked Elias with a "Superman punch". Reigns then sent Elias to the ring as the bell rang, and executed a spear to win the match in eight seconds.

In the next match, Seth Rollins defended the Universal Championship against AJ Styles. The end came when Rollins avoided a "Phenomenal Forearm" attempt from Styles and performed the Ripcord Knee, followed by a superkick and The Stomp to retain the title. After the match, Styles and Rollins showed mutual respect by shaking hands.

After that, Lucha House Party (Kalisto, Gran Metalik, and Lince Dorado) came out for an unadvertised match, however, they were attacked by Lars Sullivan and the match never occurred.

In the penultimate match, Kofi Kingston defended the WWE Championship against Kevin Owens. At the request from Kingston, fellow New Day member Xavier Woods did not accompany Kingston to the ring. The finish came as Owens attempted a Swanton from the top rope. Kingston countered by raising his knees and then performed the Trouble in Paradise on Owens to retain the title.

Main event 
The main event was the men's Money in the Bank ladder match, which began with seven of the eight scheduled participants: Baron Corbin, Drew McIntyre and Ricochet from Raw, and Ali, Andrade, Finn Bálor and Randy Orton from SmackDown – a replacement was not immediately announced for Sami Zayn. The finish saw Ali about to retrieve the briefcase, when Brock Lesnar (along with Paul Heyman) made a surprise return – making him Raw's unannounced fourth participant in place of Zayn. Lesnar ran to the ring, knocked Ali off the ladder, and then climbed the ladder to retrieve the briefcase to win the match. With this victory, Lesnar became the third wrestler (after Edge and Sheamus) to win Money in the Bank, King of the Ring and the Royal Rumble.

Reception 
Dave Meltzer of the Wrestling Observer Newsletter said, "The WWE Universal Championship match was the rare WWE PPV match that would fit in on an NXT show".

Aftermath 
On the following night's Raw, men's Money in the Bank ladder match winner Brock Lesnar along with Paul Heyman put out a warning to Universal Champion Seth Rollins and WWE Champion Kofi Kingston, who appeared via the wild card rule, and later teased cashing in on them. On SmackDown, WWE Champion Kofi Kingston and Xavier Woods had a welcome back celebration for Big E, returning from his injury. Kevin Owens interrupted but The New Day berated him about losing. The following week, Kingston and Owens had a non-title rematch that Kingston also won. AJ Styles was interviewed on Raw about his loss to Universal Champion Seth Rollins, but was interrupted by Baron Corbin. The following week, Styles was scheduled to compete in a fatal four-way match for another opportunity to challenge Rollins at Super ShowDown, but was still ailing from injuries sustained from Money in the Bank and was replaced by Corbin.

Raw Women's Champion Becky Lynch appeared on Alexa Bliss's "A Moment of Bliss", co-hosted by Nikki Cross. They were interrupted by WWE Women's Tag Team Champions The IIconics (Billie Kay and Peyton Royce), as well as Lacey Evans, who boasted about causing Lynch to lose the SmackDown Women's Championship. This led to a six-woman tag team match in which Lynch, Cross, and Bliss defeated Evans and The IIconics. A rematch between Lynch and Evans was scheduled for Stomping Grounds. On SmackDown, Charlotte Flair competed in a triple threat match in an attempt to earn a rematch against Bayley for the SmackDown Women's Championship at Stomping Grounds, but it was won by Raw's Alexa Bliss, appearing via the wild card rule.

Roman Reigns had a rematch with Elias on SmackDown that Reigns also won, but was attacked by Drew McIntyre, who appeared via the wild card rule. Reigns was also scheduled to face Shane McMahon at Super ShowDown. Miz confronted Shane backstage on Raw, but was intervened by McIntyre, who defeated Miz in a match.

Samoa Joe said that he was not angry at Rey Mysterio for the referee's mistake, but said Mysterio should hand him back the championship to set a good example for his son Dominik. It was then revealed that Mysterio suffered a shoulder injury thanks to Joe's post-match beat down at Money in the Bank, and he relinquished the title back to Joe on the June 3 episode of Raw.

On Raw, Sami Zayn was scheduled to face Braun Strowman. Zayn attempted to get help from Bobby Lashley, who was scheduled to face Strowman at Super ShowDown. Lashley, however, refused to help Zayn who lost to Strowman. Also on Raw, as Lars Sullivan was about to be interviewed in regard to his attack on Lucha House Party (Kalisto, Lince Dorado, and Gran Metalik), he was interrupted by the team. The trio attacked Sullivan, however, Sullivan fended them off. A 3-on-1 handicap match pitting Sullivan against Lucha House Party was scheduled for Super ShowDown.

Following their scuffle during the women's ladder match, Carmella had a match against Mandy Rose on the May 28 episode of SmackDown. Rose won the match thanks to a distraction from Sonya Deville. They continued their feud over the following episodes.

Results

References

External links 
 

2019 WWE Network events
2019 WWE pay-per-view events
2019
2019 in Connecticut
Professional wrestling in Hartford, Connecticut
Events in Hartford, Connecticut
May 2019 events in the United States